Var Kola or Var Kala may refer to:
 Var Kola, Chalus
 Var Kola, Miandorud